Atelier Kempe Thill is an architectural firm that includes Oliver Thill and André Kempe, originally from East Germany who graduated of TU Dresden. They are now based in Rotterdam, Netherlands.

Thill won the Maaskant Prize for Young Architects 2005, and the firm designed the Dutch pavilion for a garden exhibition in Rostock, Germany in 2003 (The Hedge Building), and won design competitions for the renovation of the youth hostel in Prora (East Germany, 2004) and a "modest" concert hall in Raiding (Austria, 2005). According to the firm's website they have also constructed the HipHouse in Zwolle, a museum building in Veenhuizen, town houses in Amsterdam-Osdorp, terraced houses in Roosendaal, a town hall in Alblasserdam, a housing block in Amsterdam and other projects in a few European nations.

Awards 
Special Mention European Prize for Urban Public Space 2010 (Open Air Theatre Grotekerkplein Rotterdam).

References

External links
Atelier Kempe Thill website

Architecture firms of the Netherlands